Kennan Gilchrist (born September 13, 1994) is a professional Canadian football linebacker who is currently a free agent. He most recently played for the Toronto Argonauts of the Canadian Football League (CFL).  He played college football for the Appalachian State Mountaineers from 2013 to 2016.

Gilchrist  began his professional career as an undrafted free agent signing with the Dallas Cowboys on April 30, 2017. He was released following training camp and then spent time with the Houston Texans and San Antonio Commanders. Following the suspension and bankruptcy of the Alliance of American Football, Gilchrist signed with the Argonauts on April 16, 2019 and played in 14 games in 2019. He did not play in 2020 due to the cancellation of the 2020 CFL season and was released by the Argonauts on December 15, 2020.

References

External links
Toronto Argonauts bio

1994 births
Living people
American football linebackers
Canadian football linebackers
Appalachian State Mountaineers football players
Dallas Cowboys players
Houston Texans players
San Antonio Commanders players
People from Abbeville, South Carolina
Players of American football from South Carolina
Toronto Argonauts players